Alexandros Zaimis (9 November 1855 – 15 September 1936) was a Greek politician who served as Greece's Prime Minister, Minister of the Interior, Minister of Justice, and High Commissioner of Crete. He served as Prime Minister six times, and although a leader of the monarchist faction was the third and last President of the Second Hellenic Republic.

Early life and family
Zaimis was born in Athens, a son of Thrasyvoulos Zaimis, a former Prime Minister of Greece, and Eleni Mourouzi. His brother was Asimakis Zaimis. 

On his father's side he was the grandson of Andreas Zaimis, another former Prime Minister of Greece, and related to the great Kalavrytan family with notable participation in the Greek War of Independence from 1821. From his mother's side he was a descendant of an important Fanariote family of the Mourozidon. His family lived in Kerpini, Kalavryta in the Achaia prefecture.

He studied law at the University of Athens and at the University of Heidelberg.  He also attended the universities of Leipzig, Paris and Berlin.

Political career

Alexandros became involved in politics after the death of his father who was the elected member of parliament for Kalavryta.

He became a Member of Parliament in 1885. He served as Minister of the Interior and Justice Minister in Theodoros Deligiannis' government (1890–92) and Speaker of the Hellenic Parliament (1895-97). He became Prime Minister for the first time in 1897.

Appointment as High Commissioner

In 1906, he was appointed as High Commissioner of Crete and presided over a critical period of the island's history up to the de facto union of Crete with Greece in 1908.

Re-election as Prime Minister

Alexandros Zaimis was re-elected as Prime Minister a further five times. He was appointed Prime Minister under King Constantine I to succeed Venizelos in October 1915, but resigned a month later when his government failed to receive a vote of confidence. In 1917, Zaimis served again as Prime Minister under King Constantine I, while Eleftherios Venizelos led a rival government controlling northern Greece. Under Entente pressure, he resigned in favor of Venizelos in June of the same year.  During World War I, he was generally supposed to favor neutrality for Greece, but to be personally in favor of the Allies.

A moderate conservative, he served again as Prime Minister in the Second Hellenic Republic, from 1926 to 1928, in a coalition government of Venizelist and moderate conservatives.

Zaimis was elected the third and last President of the Second Hellenic Republic in 1929.  He was reelected in 1933.  However, only two years into his second term, he was thrown out of office by Georgios Kondylis, who abolished the Republic and proclaimed himself regent pending the results of a referendum on restoring the monarchy.  This referendum resulted in George II being recalled to the throne by almost 98 percent of the vote, an implausibly high total that could have only been obtained through fraud.

Death and legacy

He died on 15 September 1936 in Vienna, Austria and was buried in the First Cemetery of Athens. He was married without children. The political legacy of his family was continued by his siblings and cousins.

References

Sources

External links
 

1855 births
1936 deaths
20th-century presidents of Greece
19th-century prime ministers of Greece
20th-century prime ministers of Greece
Politicians from Athens
Greek MPs 1885–1887
Foreign ministers of Greece
Prime Ministers of Greece
Presidents of Greece
Speakers of the Hellenic Parliament
Cretan State
High Commissioners of Crete
Greek people of the Greco-Turkish War (1897)
Burials in Athens